Berry Forte (born October 26, 1937) is an American politician. He is a Democratic member of the Alabama House of Representatives from the 84th District, serving since 2010. Forte resides in Eufaula, Alabama, where he worked for American Buildings and is a member of Tabernacle Baptist Church.

References

1937 births
Living people
Democratic Party members of the Alabama House of Representatives
21st-century American politicians